Nadhir Leknaoui (born 19 May 1972) is a retired Algerian football goalkeeper and the current manager of Paradou AC.

References

1972 births
Living people
People from Annaba
Algerian footballers
USM Annaba players
Association football goalkeepers
Algerian football managers
USM Annaba managers
CRB Aïn Fakroun managers
US Biskra managers
USM Khenchela managers
MC Oran managers
NA Hussein Dey managers
ASO Chlef managers
Algerian Ligue Professionnelle 1 managers
21st-century Algerian people